Associação Desportiva São Benedito, usually called São Benedito, is the main football (soccer) club in São Benedito, Ceará, Brazil. It was founded on January 20, 2005.

References

Football clubs in Ceará
Association football clubs established in 2005
2005 establishments in Brazil